Cas Mudde (born 3 June 1967) is a Dutch political scientist who focuses on political extremism and populism in Europe and the United States. His research includes the areas of political parties, extremism, democracy, civil society and European politics.

Biography
Mudde was a visiting scholar at the Janet Prindle Institute for Ethics and visiting associate professor in the political science department at DePauw University in Greencastle, Indiana.

From 1999 to 2002 he was assistant professor at the University of Edinburgh, and from 2002 to 2010 he was Assistant and later Associate Professor at the University of Antwerp in Belgium. Since 2010, he has been teaching a first year seminar on the Radical Right movement in Europe at DePauw University. He is Associate Professor of Political Science at the University of Georgia's School of Public and International Affairs. He is also adjunct professor at the Center for Research on Extremism (C-REX) at the University of Oslo.

He is the co-founder and convener of the ECPR (European Consortium for Political Research) Standing Group on Extremism & Democracy. He is a board member of the IPSA (International Political Science Association) Committee on Concepts and Methods and serves on the editorial boards of academic journals such as Acta Politica, Democracy and Security, Patterns of Prejudice, Politics in Central Europe, and The Journal of Politics.

Mudde is an author of several books and articles. He is the younger brother of the former rightist Tim Mudde. In the preface to The Ideology of the Extreme Right, he thanks him for the respect they still have for each other despite "differences of opinion".

In 2008 Mudde was awarded the Stein Rokkan Prize for Comparative Social Science Research.

Bibliography

Books
 
 
 
  (View Table of contents, Introduction, and Index.)

Journal articles
  Online.

References

External links
 
 Homepage at University of Georgia School of Public and International Affairs
 Homepage at University of Antwerp
 Cas Mudde: The populist radical Right: A pathological normalcy (Eurozine, 31 August 2010) 
 Interview with Cas Mudde  (in Dutch)

1967 births
Living people
Academics and writers on far-right extremism
Populism scholars
DePauw University faculty
University of Georgia faculty
Dutch emigrants to the United States
Dutch political scientists
Winners of the Stein Rokkan Prize for Comparative Social Science Research